Herbert Stanley Jevons, aka HS Jevons (1875-1955), was the son of economist and mathematician William Stanley Jevons. He was professor of economics and political science at University of South Wales. He was also the first Head of Department of Economics at University of Allahabad. Jevons was the first Secretary of the Abyssinian Association and the first treasurer of the Anglo-Ethiopian Society. He started the Indian Journal of Economics. He was also the first president of Indian Economic Association.

Reference

External Links
 

1875 births
1955 deaths